Johann Wagner (born 16 October 1990) is a former professional Australian rules footballer who was listed with the Port Adelaide Football Club in the Australian Football League (AFL).

Wagner was the winner of the 2014 Fox8 reality television show The Recruit, and as his prize, was offered a Category B AFL rookie list position with one of three AFL clubs for the 2015 AFL season. He chose to join Port Adelaide, over GWS and Gold Coast to remain in his home state of South Australia. He was delisted by Port Adelaide at the conclusion of the 2015 season after only one season with the club. Wagner went  back to his former state team, Tasmans, in Port Lincoln, South Australia. He was their leading goal kicker in season 2016.

References

External links
Central District profile

1990 births
Living people
Central District Football Club players
Australian rules footballers from South Australia
Australian people of German descent